Industriales is a baseball team in the Cuban National Series. Located in Cerro, La Habana, it is known as the only team representing the country’s capital, Havana. Industriales is historically the most successful team in the National Series, although they have played under other names throughout their history. The Super Classic of Cuban National Series takes place six times per season between Industriales and Santiago de Cuba, the Cuban equivalent of the New York Yankees–Boston Red Sox rivalry. The matchup also represents the rivalry between the two cities (La Habana and Santiago de Cuba), dating back to the era when Cuba was a colony of Spain more than two centuries ago. They are known as  the Lions (los leones), "The Blues" (los azules) or "The Blue Lions" (los Leones Azules). Royal blue is their color, though teams like Camagüey and Ciego de Ávila also have blue uniforms (navy blue and sky blue, respectively.)

History
The team was founded in 1962, as representatives of all the workers from all the industries of Cuba. Industriales is the perceived successor to the Almendares baseball team from the professional Cuban League. They won the Cuban National Series in 1963, 1964, 1965, 1966, 1973, 1986, 1992, 1996, 2003, 2004, 2006 and 2010. Today the team holds the record of victories in a season (96 games in Cuba) with 66 games and more National Series won in a row with 4 straight national championships (1963-1966).

Current roster

Season 2017-2018
Catchers: Frank C. Morejón, Lázaro Ponce, Roberto Loredo, Randy Montenegro
Infielders: Alexander Malleta, Yordanis Samón, Juan C. Torriente, Wilfredo Aroche, Yolbert Sánchez, Joel Mestre, Osmel Cordero, Jorge L. Barcelán, Andrés Hernández, Edwin Y. Caballero, Walter Pacheco
Outfielders: Víctor V. Mesa, Stayler Hernández, Yohandri Urgellés, Yoasán Guillén, Javier Camero, Jorge Tartabull, Asnier Fonseca
Pitchers: Frank Montieth, Noelvis Entenza, Ian Rendón, Alexander Rodríguez, Dairon Durán, Adrián Sosa, José A. Pérez, Yoel D. Paula, Michel Reinoso, Julio R. Montesinos, David Mena, Pavel Hernández, Eddy A. García, Andy Valdés, Javier del Pino, Denis Castillo, Raymond Figueredo, Yasmany Robert,

National Series MVPs
The following Industriales players have been named the National Series' most valuable player.
1965 Urbano González
1967 Pedro Chávez
1971 Antonio Jiménez
1972 Agustín Marquetti
1986 Lázaro Vargas
1987 Javier Méndez
1996 Jorge Fumero
2003 Javier Méndez
2020 Lisbán Correa

Other notable players
 Rey Vicente Anglada (second base)
 Juan Carlos Barrutia (pitcher)
 Armando Capiró (outfield)
 Gerardo Concepción (pitcher)
 José Modesto Darcourt (pitcher)
 Ángel Leocadio Díaz (pitcher)
 Yasser Gomez (outfielder)
 Antonio González (baseball) (shortstop)
 Orlando "El Duque" Hernández (pitcher)
 Ricardo Lazo (catcher)
 Raúl López (pitcher)
 Reinaldo Linares (outfield)
 Agustin Marqueti (first baseman)
 Yadel Martí (pitcher)
 Santiago "Changa Mederos" Mederos (pitcher)
 Pedro Medina (catcher)
 Javier Mendez (outfielder)
 Germán Mesa (shortstop)
 Kendrys Morales (pitcher-outfielder-infielder)
 Eulogio Osorio (outfield)
 Juan Padilla (second base)
 Rodolfo Puente (shortstop)
 Amauri Sanit (pitcher)
 Carlos Tabares (centerfielder)
 Lázaro de la Torre (pitcher)
 Yoandry Urgelles (outfielder)
 Lázaro Valle (pitcher)

Emigrants
A number of Industriales players have defected from Cuba, often to pursue professional baseball in other countries. These include the following:
 Jesus Ametller
 Ivan Alvarez
 Luis Alvarez Estrada
 Juan Chavez Álvarez
 Leonardo Fariñas
 René Arocha
 Evel Bastida
 Bárbaro Cañizares
 Alexis Cabrejas
 Roberto Colina
 Gerardo Concepción
 Yunel Escobar
 Osvaldo Fernandez Guerra
 Bárbaro Garbey
 Mario González
 Yamel Guevara
 Adrian Hernández
 Michel Hernández
 Orlando Hernández
 Manuel Hurtado
 Yoan Limonta-Zayas
 Donell Linares
 Agustin Marquetti, Jr..
 Ángel Leocadio Díaz
 Kendrys Morales
 Vladimir Núñez
 Rey Ordóñez
 William Ortega
 Hassan Peña
 Rolando Pastor
 Mayque Quintero
 Euclides Rojas
 Rolando Viera
 Omar Yapur
 Yadel Martí
 Yasser Gomez
 Odrisamer Despaigne
 Yulieski Gurriel
 Lourdes Gurriel Jr.
 Andy Rodríguez
 Bryan Chi

Television broadcasts 
Beginning 2016-2017, alongside the nationally aired games on Tele Rebelde, several Industriales games at home are aired currently on local TV channel Canal Habana.

External links

  Official Site 
 

Industriales (Havana)
Baseball in Havana
Baseball teams established in 1962
1962 establishments in Cuba